The 1975 Honduran coup d'état took place on 22 April 1975, with Oswaldo López Arellano being ousted in a military coup led by his fellow General Juan Alberto Melgar Castro. The coup was prompted in part by the "Bananagate" scandal, exposed by the U.S. Securities and Exchange Commission in 1975, in which the United Brands Company agreed to bribe President López with US$1.25 million, and the promise of another $1.25 million upon the reduction of certain banana export taxes.

References

Honduras
Coup D'état
Military coups in Honduras
April 1975 events in North America